Khooni Ilaaka: The Prohibited Area  is a Hindi Horror movie of Bollywood directed by Jitendra Chawda and produced by Kajal Mukherjee. This film was released on 14 May 1999 in the banner of Ishwar Films.

Plot
The story revolves around the activities of an evil spirit which is reborn to take vengeance against a family. One day all the family members decide to go outside leaving their younger sister at home. But they could not return due to some astonishing incident which happens due to that spirit. While they are going through a deadly forest area known as the Khooni Ilaaka they are attacked by the evil spirit. Long ago, a wicked Tantrik was killed by villagers and he cursed the area even after his horrific death. Being worried and without knowing this past, the sister and her boyfriend go to search for her brother and sister in-law.

Cast
 Kishore Bhanushali
 Deepak Shirke
 Rami Reddy
 Swapna
 Jyoti Rana
 Vinod Tripathi
 Anil Nagrath
 Arif Khan
 Anuradha Sawant

References

External links
 

1999 films
1990s Hindi-language films
Indian horror films
1999 horror films
Hindi-language horror films